Charlene "Michael" Hyatt is a British-born American actress. Before her work in film and television, she performed on stages throughout the United States, particularly in Ragtime on Broadway. She has played Brianna Barksdale on The Wire, Dr. Noelle Akopian on Crazy Ex-Girlfriend and Detective Sheila Muncie on Ray Donovan.

Early life
Hyatt was born in Birmingham, West Midlands, to Jamaican-born parents, Vera Hyatt, an art historian, museologist, and former deputy director of the National Gallery of Jamaica, and Charles Hyatt, an actor, broadcaster, and comedian.

As a child, Hyatt was exposed to art and theater from the work of both of her parents during the 1970s in Jamaica. Hyatt migrated to the United States with her mother and two siblings when she was 10 years old. The family lived in Maryland and then Washington, D.C. Hyatt has a Bachelor of Fine Arts from Howard University and received her Master of Fine Arts from New York University's Tisch School of the Arts. During college, she did a theater practicum and worked at Arena Stage in Washington, D.C. During grad school, she worked for director Spike Lee as an assistant.

Career
Hyatt has worked extensively in theater, television, and film. Early in her career, Hyatt performed for five months on Broadway in the musical Ragtime.

She played the role of Rita in the 2009 Los Angeles production of the Danai Gurira play, Eclipsed.

Hyatt had a recurring role on the first four seasons of the HBO series The Wire as Brianna Barksdale. She starred in Spike TV's The Kill Point as SWAT team commander Connie Reubens. She has guest starred on both Aaron Sorkin's The West Wing and Studio 60 on the Sunset Strip. She has also made brief appearances in ER, 24, Law & Order, Six Feet Under, The Big Bang Theory, Veronica Mars, Oz, Criminal Minds, Joan of Arcadia, Dexter, and Glee.

Hyatt had a featured role in the 2014 film Nightcrawler as a police detective. She had a recurring role in the second season of the HBO series True Detective.

She had a recurring role on Crazy Ex-Girlfriend as Rebecca's (Rachel Bloom) therapist, Dr. Akopian. Hyatt portrays Detective Sheila Muncie in the TV show, Ray Donovan.

Since July 2017 she has starred on the FX series Snowfall as Cissy Saint, mother of drug dealer Franklin Saint, a role she first played in its 2016 pilot.

Personal life 
Hyatt has used the name "Michael" since high school, when she was nicknamed for being a fan of American entertainer Michael Jackson. She has one son.

Filmography

Film

Television

References

External links

Living people
Howard University alumni
Tisch School of the Arts alumni
British emigrants to the United States
American television actresses
American actors of Jamaican descent
21st-century American actresses
Actresses from Maryland
Actresses from Washington, D.C.
20th-century American actresses
American stage actresses
Actresses from Birmingham, West Midlands
1970 births